The Ludgate Monthly was a London-based monthly magazine, which published short fiction and articles of general interest. There were 118 issues from May 1891 to February 1901; the magazine then merged with The Universal Magazine.

The magazine was published from May 1891 to October 1893 under the title The Ludgate Monthly for 30 issues, from November 1893 to October 1895 under the title The Ludgate Illustrated Magazine for 24 issues, from November 1895 to February 1901 under the title The Ludgate for 64 issues, and was then merged into The Universal Magazine. The Ludgate Weekly was a spinoff magazine which lasted less than a year (from 5 March to 1 October 1892); the first issue of this weekly had a Conan Doyle story The Great Brown-Pericord Motor.

Philip May (the novelist, not the caricaturist Phil May), was the editor of The Ludgate Monthly from its 1891 inception (selling for three pence per copy) to 1894. The first issue contained stories by Rudyard Kipling, John Augustus O'Shea, and Florence Marryat. The Ludgate is known for publishing the Red Mask by Rafael Sabatini and some of the earliest stories by C. Ranger Gull. James Nicol Dunn was the second editor, serving from 1895 to 1897.

Editorship

References

External links
The Ludgate monthly, Hathi Trust Digital Library

1891 establishments in the United Kingdom
1901 disestablishments in the United Kingdom
Monthly magazines published in the United Kingdom
Defunct magazines published in the United Kingdom
Fiction magazines
Magazines established in 1891
Magazines disestablished in 1901
Magazines published in London